Spangles is a 1928 British silent drama film directed by George Banfield and starring Fern Andra, Forrester Harvey and Lewis Dayton. It was made at Walthamstow Studios. A circus girl goes to London and enjoys great success. However, she eventually decides to return home.

Cast
 Fern Andra as Spangles 
 Forrester Harvey as Watty 
 Lewis Dayton as Hugh Gridstone 
 A. Bromley Davenport as Romanovitch 
 James Knight as Haggerston 
 A.B. Imeson as Earl of Warborough 
 Gladys Frazin as Countess 
 Carlton Chase as Dennis Adderly

References

Bibliography
 Low, Rachel. The History of British Film: Volume IV, 1918–1929. Routledge, 1997.
 Wood, Linda. British Films, 1927-1939. British Film Institute, 1986.

External links

1928 films
British drama films
British silent feature films
1928 drama films
Films directed by George Banfield
Films shot at Walthamstow Studios
Films set in London
British black-and-white films
1920s English-language films
1920s British films
Silent drama films